The Horace Baker Log Cabin is a historic log cabin located near Carver, Oregon, United States. It was built around 1856 by American pioneer Horace Baker.

The cabin was listed on the National Register of Historic Places in 1976.

See also
National Register of Historic Places listings in Clackamas County, Oregon

References

External links
Baker Cabin Historical Society
Building Oregon

Oregon Historic Sites Database

1856 establishments in Oregon Territory
Historic house museums in Oregon
Houses completed in 1856
Houses in Clackamas County, Oregon
Houses on the National Register of Historic Places in Oregon
Log cabins in the United States
Museums in Clackamas County, Oregon
National Register of Historic Places in Clackamas County, Oregon
Log buildings and structures on the National Register of Historic Places in Oregon